Madventures is a Pakistani adaptation of the popular reality show Fear Factor. The first season of the series premiered on 22 February 2013 on ARY Digital, and was presented by Pakistani television actor Ahsan Khan. And won by Priyamvada Kant from India. The second season began airing on 1 August 2015 which was hosted by Pakistani Comedian and Actor Ahmad Ali Butt.

Concept
Madventures originated as a 13-part series that aired on SET Asia in 2013. Season 1 was shot in Thailand. Six Pakistani and six Indian celebrities participated.

In the second season, all celebrities were Pakistani.

Host
Season 1 was hosted by the television actor Ahsan Khan. Season 2 was hosted by Ahmed Ali Butt.While, season 3 was hosted by Mohib Mirza.

Series overview

Season 1

Contestants
Six Pakistani and six Indian celebrities are participating in the show.

Winners (Pakistan) 
 Mehwish Hayat & Sana Nawaz

Winner (India)
 Priyamvada Kant

Pakistani contestants 
 Mehwish Hayat
 Sana Nawaz
 Sana Askari
 Ayesha Toor
 Zeba Ali
 Madiha Iftikhar

Indian contestants 
 Priyamvada Kant
 Leena Jumani
 Priyal Gor
 Shafaq Naaz
 Melanie Pais
 Hritu Dudani

Season 2
Only Pakistani Celebrities (1 Male and 1 Female) combined participated in the show.

Contestants
 Danish Hayat & Mehwish Hayat (Winner)
 Taifoor Khan & Saima Azhar (1st Runner-up)
 Daniyal Raheel & Farah Ali (2nd Runner-up)
 Saim Ali & Natasha Ali
 Fakhar Imam & Sana Nawaz
 Khurram Patras & Hina Altaf (Eliminated on 6th place)
 Minhaj Ali Askari & Sana Askari (Eliminated on 7th place)
 Kanwar Arsalan & Fatima Effendi (Eliminated on 8th place)
 Faiq Khan & Rahma Ali (Eliminated on 9th place)
 Nouman Javaid & Rabab Hashim (Eliminated on 10th Place)

Season 3
Season 3 was hosted by Mohib Mirza  started airing from 2 March 2018 on ARY Zindagi. As with season 2, only Pakistani celebrated participated in the show.

Contestants
Fahad Shaikh and Mahi Baloch (Winners)
Raeed Muhammad Alam and Shazia Naz (1st Runner-up)
Ayaz Samoo and Anoushay Abbasi (2nd Runner-up)
Noman Habib and Sukaina Khan (Eliminated on 4th place)
Yasir Shoro and Iqra (Eliminated on 5th place)
Mani and Anum Aqeel (Eliminated on 6th place)
Taqi Ahmed and Anam Tanveer (Eliminated on 7th place)
Aadi Khan and Eshita Syed (Eliminated on 8th place)
Sohail and Dua Malik (Eliminated on 9th place)
Faizan Shaikh and Maham Amir (Eliminated on 10th place)

References

2013 Pakistani television series debuts
ARY Digital original programming
Pakistani game shows
Pakistani reality television series
Urdu-language television shows
Fear Factor
Television shows filmed in Thailand
Pakistani television series based on American television series